In mathematical optimization, the problem of non-negative least squares (NNLS) is a type of constrained least squares problem where the coefficients are not allowed to become negative. That is, given a matrix  and a (column) vector of response variables , the goal is to find

Here  means that each component of the vector  should be non-negative, and  denotes the Euclidean norm.

Non-negative least squares problems turn up as subproblems in matrix decomposition, e.g. in algorithms for PARAFAC and non-negative matrix/tensor factorization. The latter can be considered a generalization of NNLS.

Another generalization of NNLS is bounded-variable least squares (BVLS), with simultaneous upper and lower bounds .

Quadratic programming version
The NNLS problem is equivalent to a quadratic programming problem

where  =  and  = .

Algorithms
The first widely used algorithm for solving this problem is an active-set method published by Lawson and Hanson in their 1974 book Solving Least Squares Problems. In pseudocode, this algorithm looks as follows:

 Inputs:
 a real-valued matrix  of dimension ,
 a real-valued vector  of dimension ,
 a real value , the tolerance for the stopping criterion.
 Initialize:
 Set .
 Set }.
 Set  to an all-zero vector of dimension .
 Set .
 Let  denote the sub-vector with indexes from R
 Main loop: while  and :
Let  denote the sub-vector with indexes from P, and let  denote the sub-vector with indexes from R.
 Set 
 Set  to zero
 While :
 Let .
 Move to  all indices  in  such that .
 Set 
 Set  to zero.
 Output: x

This algorithm takes a finite number of steps to reach a solution and smoothly improves its candidate solution as it goes (so it can find good approximate solutions when cut off at a reasonable number of iterations), but is very slow in practice, owing largely to the computation of the pseudoinverse .

Many improved algorithms have been suggested since 1974. Fast NNLS (FNNLS) is an optimized version of the Lawson—Hanson algorithm. Other algorithms include variants of Landweber's gradient descent method and coordinate-wise optimization based on the quadratic programming problem above.

See also
 M-matrix
 Perron–Frobenius theorem

References

Least squares
Articles with example pseudocode